Poyner v. Commissioner 301 F.2d 287 (4th Cir.1962) is a United States tax law case that discusses whether "special death benefits" paid to an employee's widow are exempt from taxes as a gift under §102(a).

It produces five factors as a pertinent test:

(1) whether the payments were made to the spouse of the deceased shareholder, not to his estate;

(2) whether the payor had been under no obligation to make the payments and had, in fact, decided on previous occasions not to make payments to persons qualified;

(3) whether the company derived benefit of an economic nature from the payments;

(4) whether the recipient had ever performed any services for the company;

(5) whether the services of the deceased employee had been fully compensated during his lifetime.

Citations
 Commissioner v. Duberstein, 363 U.S. 278 (1960)
 United States v. Kaiser, 363 U.S. 299 (1960)
 Bogardus v. Commissioner, 302 U.S. 34 (1937)
 Simpson v. United States, 261 F.2d 497 (7th Cir. 1958)
 Bounds v. United States, 262 F.2d 876 (4th Cir. 1958)

References

External links

United States taxation and revenue case law
United States Court of Appeals for the Fourth Circuit cases
1962 in United States case law